Gorilla Biscuits is the first album, released as a 7-inch EP, by the hardcore band Gorilla Biscuits. It was later released on CD.

Critical reception
AllMusic gave the album a mixed review, writing that "the first release from hardcore legends Gorilla Biscuits is a vital part of the band's history but still far from the classic Start Today LP issued only a year later."

Track listing (7-inch)
All songs written by Walter Schreifels.

Side A
 "High Hopes" – 2:25
 "Big Mouth" – 2:00
 "No Reason Why" – 1:53
 "GM2" – 0:21
Side B
 "Hold Your Ground" – 2:02
 "Breaking Free" – 1:13
 "Finish What You Started" – 1:41

Track listing (CD)
 "High Hopes" – 2:25
 "Big Mouth" – 2:00
 "No Reason Why" – 1:53
 "GM2" – 0:21
 "Hold Your Ground" – 2:02
 "Breaking Free" – 1:13
 "Finish What You Started" – 1:41
 "Sitting Round at Home" (Buzzcocks cover)  – 1:43 
 "Biscuit Power" – 1:24 (song also known elsewhere as "Gorilla Biscuits")
 "Short End of the Stick" – 1:32 
 "Hold Your Ground" (Different lyrics) – 2:04 
 "GM2" – 1:13 (song also known elsewhere as "Slut")
 Tracks 8 to 12 are unlisted.

Members
 CIV - vocals
 Walter Schreifels - guitar
 Arthur Smilios - bass guitar
 Luke Abbey - drums

References

1988 debut albums
Gorilla Biscuits albums
Revelation Records albums
Albums produced by Don Fury